Junior Japan is a national representative rugby union team of the Japan rugby union. It is a second-tier side to the Japan national rugby union team. Junior Japan competes in the World Rugby Pacific Challenge against teams such as Samoa A, Fiji Warriors, and Argentina's Pampas XV.

The Junior Japan squad was formed in 2012 from players just outside the main Japanese national squad. In the first year, the team played a match in Tokyo against the Tongan national side, before joining the Pacific Rugby Cup in 2013.

International matches
Matches against national teams or national 'A" teams up to and including 2014 Pacific Rugby Cup: 
{|style= "table-layout:fixed; width=95%; margin-top:0;margin-left:0; border-width:1px;border-style:none ;border-color:#ddd; padding:0px; vertical-align:top;"
|-
 |15-06-2012 || align=right | || 24–45 ||  || Chichibu, Tokyo.
|-
 |18-03-2014 || align=right |  || 13–99 || Fiji Warriors ||Bond University, Gold Coast
|}

Record

Season standings
Pacific Rugby Cup
{| class="wikitable" style="text-align:center;"
|- border=1 cellpadding=5 cellspacing=0
! style="width:20px;"|Year
! style="width:20px;"|Pos
! style="width:20px;"|Pld
! style="width:20px;"|W
! style="width:20px;"|D
! style="width:20px;"|L
! style="width:20px;"|F
! style="width:20px;"|A
! style="width:25px;"|+/-
! style="width:20px;"|TB
! style="width:20px;"|LB
! style="width:20px;"|Pts
! style="width:20px;"|Final
! align=left|Notes 
|- 
|- 
|align=left|2014
| 4th
| 3 || 0 || 0 || 3 || 26 ||241 ||-210 || 0 || 0 ||  0
| – ||align=left| Finished 4th in Pool A
|-
|align=left|2013
| 3rd
| 6 || 0 || 0 || 6 || 140 || 361 ||-221 || 3 || 0 ||  3
| – ||align=left|
|}

See also

References

External links
2014 Pacific Rugby Cup News on oceaniarugby.com

Japan national rugby union team
Second national rugby union teams
2012 establishments in Japan
Rugby clubs established in 2012
National sports teams established in 2012